Jarl is a rank of the nobility in Scandinavia. In Old Norse, it meant "chieftain", particularly a chieftain set to rule a territory in a king's stead. Jarl could also mean a sovereign prince. For example, the rulers of several of the petty kingdoms of Norway had the title of jarl and in many cases they had no less power than their neighbours who had the title of king. It became obsolete in the Middle Ages and was replaced by duke (hertig/hertug/hertog). The word is etymologically related to the English earl.

Etymology 

The term jarl has been compared to the name of the Heruli, and to runic erilaz. Proto-Norse eril, or the later Old Norse , came to signify the rank of a leader.

Norway

In later medieval Norway, the title of jarl was the highest rank below the king. There was usually no more than one jarl in mainland Norway at any one time, and sometimes none. The ruler of the Norwegian dependency of Orkney held the title of jarl, and after Iceland had acknowledged Norwegian overlordship in 1261, a jarl was sent there, as well, as the king's high representative. In mainland Norway, the title of jarl was usually used for one of two purposes:

 To appoint a de facto ruler in cases where the king was a minor or seriously ill (e.g. Håkon Galen in 1204 during the minority of king Guttorm, Skule Bårdsson in 1217 during the illness of king Inge Bårdsson).
 To appease a pretender to the throne without giving him the title of king (e.g. Eirik, the brother of king Sverre).

In 1237, jarl Skule Bårdsson was given the rank of duke (hertug). This was the first time this title had been used in Norway, and meant that the title jarl was no longer the highest rank below the king. It also heralded the introduction of new noble titles from continental Europe, which were to replace the old Norse titles. The last jarl in mainland Norway was appointed in 1295.

Some Norwegian jarls:

 Skule Tostesson, killed by peasants near Haverö church in the 12th century.
 Erling Skakke, father of king Magnus V
 Alv Erlingsson, earl of Sarpsborg and governor of Borgarsyssel.
 Haakon the Crazy
 the Jarls of Orkney
 the Jarls of Møre
 the Jarls of Lade

Sweden 

The usage of the title in Sweden was similar to Norway's. Known as jarls from the 12th and 13th century were Birger Brosa, Jon Jarl, Folke Birgersson, Charles the Deaf, Ulf Fase, and the most powerful of all jarls and the last to hold the title, Birger Jarl.

Denmark 

In Denmark the jarl was the king's deputy, as Ulf Jarl (died in 1026) was to Canute the Great, king of England, Denmark and Norway. 

The last jarl of Southern Jutland, Canute Lavard (died in 1131), became the first Danish hertug (duke), with the title "Hertug af Slesvig" ("Duke of Schleswig"). Thus the title hertug (duke) came to replace the old Norse title jarl.

Iceland 
Only one person is known to have ever held the title of Jarl in Iceland. This was Gissur Þorvaldsson, who was made Jarl of Iceland in 1258 by King Haakon IV of Norway to aid his efforts in bringing Iceland under Norwegian kingship during the Age of the Sturlungs. He held the title until his death in 1268.

Notes

References

Medieval Norway
Medieval Sweden
Men's social titles
Norwegian noble titles
Swedish noble titles